Akron Township is a township in Big Stone County, Minnesota, United States. The population was 196 as of the 2000 census.

History
Akron Township was organized in 1881. It was named after Akron, Ohio, the former hometown of first settlers.

Geography

The city of Correll is entirely within this township geographically but is a separate entity.

Major highways
  U.S. Route 12
  Minnesota State Highway 7

Lakes
 Artichoke Lake (south edge)
 Marsh Lake

Adjacent townships
 Artichoke Township (north)
 Hegbert Township, Swift County (northeast)
 Shible Township, Swift County (east)
 Appleton Township, Swift County (southeast)
 Hantho Township, Lac qui Parle County (southeast)
 Lake Shore Township, Lac qui Parle County (south)
 Agassiz Township, Lac qui Parle County (southwest)
 Odessa Township (west)

Cemeteries
The township contains Akron Cemetery.

Demographics
As of the census of 2000, there were 196 people, 79 households, and 60 families residing in the township.  The population density was 4.0 people per square mile (1.6/km2).  There were 98 housing units at an average density of 2.0/sq mi (0.8/km2).  The racial makeup of the township was 98.98% White, and 1.02% from two or more races.

There were 79 households, out of which 27.8% had children under the age of 18 living with them, 74.7% were married couples living together, 2.5% had a female householder with no husband present, and 22.8% were non-families. 20.3% of all households were made up of individuals, and 11.4% had someone living alone who was 65 years of age or older.  The average household size was 2.48 and the average family size was 2.87.

In the township the population was spread out, with 22.4% under the age of 18, 6.1% from 18 to 24, 25.0% from 25 to 44, 23.0% from 45 to 64, and 23.5% who were 65 years of age or older.  The median age was 42 years. For every 100 females, there were 115.4 males.  For every 100 females age 18 and over, there were 114.1 males.

The median income for a household in the township was $29,750, and the median income for a family was $37,500. Males had a median income of $23,250 versus $20,417 for females. The per capita income for the township was $15,473.  About 16.7% of families and 18.7% of the population were below the poverty line, including 34.0% of those under the age of eighteen and 11.9% of those 65 or over.

References
 United States National Atlas
 United States Census Bureau 2007 TIGER/Line Shapefiles
 United States Board on Geographic Names (GNIS)

Townships in Big Stone County, Minnesota
Townships in Minnesota